Kogler or Kögler is a German surname. Notable people with the surname include:

Alfred Kogler, Austrian luger
Armin Kogler (born 1959), Austrian ski jumper
Ignaz Kögler (1680–1746), German Jesuit missionary in China
Kaspar Kögler (1838-1923), German painter, illustrator and writer
Stefan Kögler, Austrian luger
Walter Kogler (born 1967), Austrian footballer and manager

German-language surnames

de:Kogler